Jason Domino is the first person to demonstrate the efficacy of PrEP on film: by not acquiring HIV during condom-less sex with a person living with HIV with a high viral load.

He is a UK sexual health and wellbeing advocate, sex work activist and porn star.

Activism 
Speaker at the United Nations social forum of the human rights council 2017 in Palais des Nations, Geneva and at the 19th annual conference of NHIVNA

Jason has spoken about his experience as a HIV negative performer in the adult industry who performs with HIV positive performers.

He has appeared on Sara Pascoe’ Sex Power Money podcast.

References 

Living people
Year of birth missing (living people)
Sex workers' rights
Labor rights

Prostitution in the United Kingdom